Copenhagen Infrastructure Partners P/S ("CIP") is an investment firm specializing in infrastructure investments, particularly wind power.

History 

Founded in 2012, CIP today is the world’s largest dedicated fund manager within greenfield renewable energy investments and a global leader in offshore wind. The funds managed by CIP focus on investments in offshore- and onshore wind, solar PV, biomass and energy-from-waste, transmission and distribution, reserve capacity and storage, Power-to-X and advanced bioenergy.
CIP manages ten funds and has to date raised approximately EUR 19 billion for investments in energy and associated infrastructure from more than 140 international institutional investors. CIP has approximately 400 employees and offices in Copenhagen, London, Hamburg, Utrecht, New York, Tokyo, Singapore, Seoul, and Melbourne. 

CIP focuses its on investments in greenfield energy infrastructure projects. By entering early, the company get exclusive access to some of the most attractive investment opportunities. De-risking and structuring the projects creates an attractive risk-adjusted return for investors alongside a significant positive impact on the local society and environment. 
CIP has a market-leading portfolio of green energy projects, totalling more than 90 GW, with a primary focus on offshore wind, onshore wind and solar PV, energy storage, Power-to-X, Waste-to-X, and other renewables. CIP aims raising €100 billion by 2030 to be invested in green energy investments.

All CIP’s funds seek to invest in renewable energy infrastructure projects which can assist in transitioning the global economy into a net-zero emissions scenario by 2050. Recently, CIP announced its Fund V - the CI V. CI V will be CIP’s 11th fund and its largest ever with a target fund size of EUR 12-16bn. It will be the largest private fund ever raised to support the transition to net zero. 

In September-November 2022, Danish business daily "Berlingske Business" published a series of articles about the past, present and future of CIP. (https://www.berlingske.dk/virksomheder/det-her-kommer-til-at-slaa-alt-igen-diskrete-danskere-vil-rejse-over)

Investment Funds 
 Copenhagen Infrastructure I K/S - established in 2012 with a total commitment of EUR ~1bn by PensionDanmark - https://cipartners.dk/2012/10/11/pensiondanmark-invests-800-meur-cip/
 Copenhagen Infrastructure II K/S - established in 2014 with a total commitment of EUR 2bn by 19 Danish and international institutional investors - https://cipartners.dk/2015/07/02/copenhagen-infrastructure-partners-ends-fundraising-period-new-fund-total-commitment-dkk-14-7bn-eur-2bn/
 Copenhagen Infrastructure III K/S - established in 2018 with a total commitment of EUR 3.5bn (hard cap) exceeding the EUR 3bn target fund size - https://cipartners.dk/2018/04/10/final-close-copenhagen-infrastructure-iii-eur-3-5-billion/
 Copenhagen Infrastructure IV K/S - established in 2020 with a total commitment of EUR 7bn (hard cap) exceeding the EUR 5.5bn target fund size - https://cipartners.dk/2021/04/19/cip-reach-final-close-on-copenhagen-infrastructure-iv-at-the-eur-7-billion-hard-cap/
 Copenhagen Infrastructure New Markets Fund I K/S - established in November 2019 with a total commitment of USD 1.0bn exceeding the target fund size - https://cipartners.dk/2019/12/05/final-close-of-ci-new-markets-fund-i-with-usd-1bn/
 Copenhagen Infrastructure Energy Transition Fund I K/S - established in June 2021 reaching first close with EUR 800m in commitments. The fund is expected to reach financial close within 9 months from first close - https://cipartners.dk/2022/08/31/copenhagen-infrastructure-partners-reach-final-close-on-ci-energy-transition-fund-i-at-the-eur-3-billion-hard-cap/
 Copenhagen Infrastructure Advanced Bioenergy Fund I K/S - reached EUR 375 million first close in April 2022 and is has a target fund size of EUR 1 billion - https://cipartners.dk/2022/04/27/cips-advanced-bioenergy-fund-reaches-first-close-with-eur-375-million-in-commitments/
 Copenhagen Infrastructure Green Credit Fund I K/S - CIP's first debt fund. Launched in 2022 with EUR 320 million in seed capital and a targeted fund size of EUR 1bn. https://cipartners.dk/2022/02/03/cip-launches-its-first-debt-fund-green-credit-fund-i-with-a-target-fund-size-of-eur-1-bn/

 CI Artemis K/S - established in 2014 with a total commitment of EUR 392m 
 CI Artemis II K/S - established in 2020 with a total commitment of approximately EUR 300m 

CIP aims for EUR 100bn in renewable energy investments by 2030.

Investors 
In just ten years, CIP has become one of the world’s most sought-after investment firms for green energy and infrastructure projects. CIP has gone from having €1 billion under management for a single Danish investor in a single fund to having €19 billion in ten funds for more than 140 Danish and international institutional investors. 
PensionDanmark (a Danish pension fund) was a founding investor and remains is a major investor.

Investments 
Through its funds, CIP has long range of investments in operation, in construction and in late-stage development. Below is listed a few.

 Høst - Danmarks første PtX anlæg til produktion af grøn ammoniak hoestptxesbjerg.dk
 Vineyeard Wind - Vineyard Wind https://www.vineyardwind.com/
 Fighting Jays - Fighting Jays Solar – Bringing Solar Power to you, https://fightingjays.com/
 Travers - Travers Solar https://www.traverssolar.com/
 Monegros - Monegroswindfarms.com 
 Star of the South - Star of the South https://www.starofthesouth.com.au/
 Veja Mate Veja Mate Offshore Project GmbH - http://www.vejamate.net/
 Misae - Home | The Great State of Texas | Misae Solar Park LLC - https://www.misaesolar.com/Home | The Great State of Texas | Misae Solar Park LLC

References 

Investment companies of Denmark
Wind power companies